The Social Democratic Pole of Romania (PDSR) was an electoral alliance in Romania ruling from 2000 to 2004 in a coalition government.

History

Formation 
It was founded by the Party of Social Democracy in Romania (PDSR), and of two smaller parties, the Romanian Social Democratic Party (PSDR) and the Humanist Party of Romania (PUR).

2000 legislative election 
In the 2000 legislative election, they gained 155 of 346 seats in the Chamber of Deputies, and 65 of 143 seats in the Senate. In 2001, the PDSR and PSDR merged into the Social Democratic Party (PSD).

Dissolution 
The two remaining parties dissolved the alliance in 2004, ahead of the local elections, in which they competed against each other. The PUR even attacked the PSD heavily for its system of "local barons". For the parliamentary election in November, they still managed to set up a new alliance, called National Union PSD+PUR to counter the center-right Justice and Truth Alliance (DA).

Electoral history

Legislative elections

Notes:

1 Social Democratic Pole of Romania members: PDSR (59 senators and 139 deputies), PSDR (2 senators and 10 deputies), and PUR (4 senators and 6 deputies).

Presidential elections

See also
 Politics of Romania
 List of political parties in Romania

References 

Defunct political party alliances in Romania
Social Democratic Party (Romania)
2000 establishments in Romania
2004 disestablishments in Romania